Tony Annese (born c. 1961) is an American football coach. He is the head football coach at Ferris State University in Big Rapids, Michigan, a position he has held since the 2012 season. Annese served as the head football coach at Grand Rapids Community College in Grand Rapids, Michigan, from 2009 to 2011, leading his teams to two National Junior College Athletic Association (NJCAA) Division II championships, in 2009 and 2011. Annese led the Ferris State Bulldogs to consecutive NCAA Division II Football Championship titles in 2021 and 2022.

Head coaching record

Junior college

College

References

External links
 Ferris State profile

Year of birth missing (living people)
1960s births
Living people
American football wide receivers
Alma Scots football players
Ferris State Bulldogs football coaches
High school football coaches in Michigan
Junior college football coaches in the United States
Coaches of American football from Michigan
Players of American football from Michigan